Living With War is the 27th studio album by Canadian / American musician Neil Young, released on May 2, 2006. The album's lyrics, titles, and conceptual style are highly critical of the policies of the George W. Bush administration; the CTV website defined it as "a musical critique of U.S. President George W. Bush and his conduct of the war in Iraq". The record was written and recorded over nine days in March and April 2006.

Living with War was nominated for a Grammy and Juno Award.

Production and release
Young began writing songs for Living with War in a Gambier, Ohio, hotel room while visiting his daughter at her college. While retrieving coffee from a vending machine early one morning, Young saw the front page of a USA Today issue documenting a surgery room on an airplane flying seriously wounded US soldiers from Iraq to Germany. He later told Charlie Rose that the combination of the vivid picture and the headline (which focused not on any suffering and death depicted, but rather on medical breakthroughs made during the war) moved him: "For some reason, that was what did it to me. I went upstairs after that. I wrote this song, 'Families'; I started writing another song, 'Restless Consumer'; I started writing all these songs all at once; I had like four songs going at once." Young has said that after writing the songs, he quickly began "coming apart." He called his wife Pegi back to their room, and "I held on to her, and I was sobbing. I was sobbing so hard, that things were coming out of my face."

The rhythm section of Rick Rosas and Chad Cromwell, and Young's "Volume Dealers" co-producer Niko Bolas were also at the core of Young's 1989 album Freedom, which contained an angry criticism of Reagan-George H. W. Bush America. There are other links between the albums: Bray also performed on Freedom and Freedoms hit single "Rockin' in the Free World" also contained a quotation of a President Bush: "a thousand points of light".

The sessions were recorded on 16-track analog tape and mixed to a half-inch analog two-track master, then transferred to high-resolution digital media for CD and DVD manufacturing. The vinyl pressing was on 200 g discs.

On April 28, 2006, the album was given a pre-release premiere in its entirety on the Los Angeles radio station KLOS (95.5) by Jim Ladd.  The album was released onto the Internet on May 2, 2006, before entering retail in May 2006.  Young has expressed that his intent is that the work be considered as a whole, and the streaming-audio internet release was the whole album, rather than individually selectable songs.

The rush release and the political nature of the tracks are also comparable to Young's 1970 song "Ohio".

In November 2006, Young released a stripped-down version of the album, Living with War: "In the Beginning", without the backing instrumentation and choral accompaniment found on the original release.

Content 
The lyrics in "Living With War" are in line with the early 1960s albums of folk artists such as Phil Ochs and Bob Dylan, although they are set to what Young calls "metal folk protest music". Time Out London similarly proclaimed the record to be an "anti-Bush folk-metal tirade".

The albums songs were performed live on  Crosby, Stills, Nash & Young’s 2006 Freedom Of Speech Tour. Selections from that tour can be heard on the “CSNY/Deja Vu (Live) album.

Reception 
Reviewing the album for Mojo magazine, Sylvie Simmons described the songs as "Urgent, instant, bolshie mostly, with a stronger individual melodic sense than, say, Greendale, but without the intense beauty of, say, Ohio … though definitely an improvement on Let's Roll". Living with War was nominated for three 2007 Grammy Awards in the categories of Best Rock Album, Best Rock Song and Best Solo Rock Vocal Performance (both for "Lookin' for a Leader").

Despite the album's content and criticism from right wing blogs leading up to the release, Young stated that he considers the album nonpartisan. He said in an interview with The New York Times: "If you impeach Bush, you're doing a huge favor for the Republicans … They can run again with some pride." 

Commenting on the lack of artists writing songs critical of American policy at the time, Young said, "I was hoping some young person would come along and say this and sing some songs about it, but I didn't see anybody, so I'm doing it myself.  I waited as long as I could."

Track listing

Personnel
 Neil Young – guitars, harmonica, vocal, producer
 Rick Rosas – bass
 Chad Cromwell – drums
 Tommy Bray – trumpet
 Rosemary Butler - vocal contractor, background vocals
 Michael Mishaw - background vocals

Production
 Niko Bolas – producer
 L. A. Johnson – assistant producer
 Mix-down at Redwood Digital with Niko Bolas and second engineer John Hausman
 Mastering by Tim Mulligan at Redwood Digital
 Digital Soundbites- Will Mitchell on "Let's Impeach the President"
 100-voice choir conducted and arranged by Darrell Brown and recorded in one 12-hour session at Capitol recording studios in Los Angeles.

Charts

References

External links
Living with War Today: page devoted to this album on Young's official website
Living with War lyrics

2006 albums
Anti-war songs
Neil Young albums
Reprise Records albums
Albums produced by Larry Johnson (film producer)
Albums produced by Niko Bolas
Albums produced by Neil Young
Folk metal albums
Heavy metal albums by Canadian artists